Omorgus satorui is a species of hide beetle in the subfamily Omorginae and subgenus Afromorgus.

References

satorui
Beetles described in 2006